Scott Davidson (born April 9, 1982) is a lacrosse player for the Colorado Mammoth in the National Lacrosse League.

References

1982 births
Living people
Lacrosse players from Connecticut
People from Guilford, Connecticut
Sportspeople from New Haven County, Connecticut